Sioux Township is a township in Clay County, Iowa, USA.  As of the 2000 census, its population was 395.

History
Sioux Township was created in 1894.

Geography

The streams of Big Muddy Creek, Little Muddy Creek, Lost Island Outlet and Prairie Creek run through this township.

Notes

References
 USGS Geographic Names Information System (GNIS)

External links
 US-Counties.com
 City-Data.com

Townships in Clay County, Iowa
Townships in Iowa